This is a list of the National Register of Historic Places listings in Dinosaur National Monument.

This is intended to be a complete list of the properties and districts on the National Register of Historic Places in Dinosaur National Monument, Utah and Colorado, United States.  The locations of National Register properties and districts for which the latitude and longitude coordinates are included below, may be seen in a Google map.

There are eight properties and districts listed on the National Register in the park, one of which is a National Historic Landmark.  Most of the park is in Moffat County, Colorado but it extends also into Uintah County, Utah; the Quarry Visitor Center is in that portion.

Current listings 

|--
|}

See also 
 National Register of Historic Places listings in Moffatt County, Colorado
 National Register of Historic Places listings in Uintah County, Utah
 List of National Historic Landmarks in Utah
 National Register of Historic Places listings in Colorado
 National Register of Historic Places listings in Utah

References 

Dinosaur National Monument